A House and Its Head is a 1935 novel by Ivy Compton-Burnett.

The main theme of the book is the family unit, and through this gender struggles are portrayed.

Duncan Edgeworth's relationship with his wife Ellen can be seen as problematic from very early on, and it is even assumed that when you read the title of the book you think that the 'head' is male based on the patriarchal stereotype. This book casually pokes fun at the art of idle gossip.

Whenever she was asked which of her novels were her favorites, Compton-Burnett always referred to A House and Its Head and Manservant and Maidservant.

Susan Sontag listed the novels of Compton-Burnett as examples of "camp" in her essay, Notes on "Camp" in 1964.

1935 British novels
Novels by Ivy Compton-Burnett
Heinemann (publisher) books